Billean Island is an island located in eastern Sabah on the Sulu Sea on Malaysia. It is part of the Sugud Islands Marine Conservation Area (SIMCA) together with Lankayan and Tegaipil.

See also
 List of islands of Malaysia

References

External links 
 Pulau Billean on getamap.net

Islands of Sabah